Mellita quinquiesperforata (Leske, 1778) is a tropical species of sand dollar, a flat, round marine animal related to sea urchins, starfish, and other echinoderms. They can be found along the eastern coast of the United States and the coast of Brazil.

References

Clypeasteroida
Animals described in 1778